WBGW-FM is a Christian radio station licensed to Fort Branch, Indiana, broadcasting on 101.5 MHz FM. The station serves the Evansville Metropolitan Area. WBGW-FM is owned by Music Ministries Inc., and is an affiliate of Thy Word Network.

Simulcasts
The station is simulcast on 88.7 WBHW in Loogootee, Indiana, 91.7 WBJW in Albion, Illinois, and 94.5 WBFW in Smith Mills, Kentucky. Thy Word Network is also heard in Owensboro, Kentucky through a translator on 106.5 FM and Tell City, Indiana through a translator on 93.7 FM.

References

External links
Thy Word Network's official website

BGW-FM
BGW-FM
Radio stations established in 1992
1992 establishments in Indiana